Joseph L. Bradley (September 24, 1928 – June 5, 1987) was an American basketball player.

Born in Washington, Oklahoma, he played collegiately for the Oklahoma State University.

He played for the Chicago Stags (1949–50) in the NBA for 46 games.

External links

1928 births
1987 deaths
Basketball players from Oklahoma
Chicago Stags players
Guards (basketball)
Oklahoma State Cowboys basketball players
Sportspeople from Oklahoma City
American men's basketball players